Peñafiel Castle is located in Peñafiel, Valladolid Province, Spain.

Fernan Gonzalez began construction on the Peñafiel site in 947, as a frontier outpost in defense against the Arabs.  A castle was built in 1013 by Sancho Garcia to protect the land. Several other members of the Spanish nobility added to the castle including Juan Manuel and Pedro Girón. Blanche I, Queen of Navarre gave birth to the Charles, Prince of Viana in the keep of Peñafiel in 1421.

Gallery

See also
 Peñafiel, Spain (town)
 Plaza del Coso

References

External links

Castles in Castile and León
Bien de Interés Cultural landmarks in the Province of Valladolid